Exploring Tomorrow was an American old-time radio series which ran on the Mutual Broadcasting System from December 4, 1957, until June 13, 1958. An advertisement described it as "the first science-fiction show of science-fictioneers, by science-fictioneers and for science-fictioneers - real science fiction for a change!"

Exploring Tomorrow was narrated by John W. Campbell, editor of Astounding Magazine. Campbell guided the career of many of the great science fiction writers of the era.

Personnel
 Producer-director: Sanford Marshall.
 Announcer: Bill Mahr, Guy Wallace
 Cast:Mandel Kramer, Bryna Raeburn, Lawson Zerbe, Lon Clark, Mason Adams, Connie Lembcke,  Larry Haines, Don Douglas, Bret Morrison, Charlotte Sheffield
 Theme: As Time Goes By 
 Writers: Randall Garrett, Gordon R. Dickson, Robert Silverberg, Isaac Asimov, Philip K. Dick, Poul Anderson, John Fleming, Raymond E. Banks, George O. Smith, Tom Godwin

Episodes

References

External links
 Arthur Lortie Arthur Lortie's definitive episode list based on correspondence with Robert Silverberg on Yahoo Groups (see below)
 RadioGOLDINdex Episode guide
Yahoo message board
Exploring Tomorrow Scripts Message board with replies from Robert Silverberg.
 OTR Plot Spot: Exploring Tomorrow - plot summaries and reviews.

1957 radio programme debuts
1958 radio programme endings
1950s American radio programs
American radio dramas
American science fiction radio programs
Mutual Broadcasting System programs
Anthology radio series